Elijah Barayi (15 June 1930 – 24 January 1994) was a South African trade union leader.

Born in Cradock, Barayi hoped to study at the Fort Hare University, but his family were unable to afford tuition, so he instead became a clerk at the Department of Native Affairs.  He joined the African National Congress (ANC) in 1952, and worked closely with James Calata.  He participated in the Defiance Campaign, presenting himself at a local police station without papers after curfew, for which he was sentenced to one month in prison.

In 1960, the ANC was banned, and Barayi was again arrested, and held for five months.  Following release, he moved to Brakpan to escape police harassment, and found work in personnel at a gold mine.  In 1973, he moved to a similar role in Carletonville, and there was elected as the chair of the mine's liaison committee.  He attempted to use the role to oppose racial discrimination and underpayment, and was banned by management from standing for a second term.

In 1981, Barayi met Cyril Ramaphosa, and this inspired him to become a founding member of the National Union of Mineworkers (NUM).  He was elected as a shaft steward, and then in 1983 as the union's vice president.  In 1985, he led a strike of 9,000 workers at the mine, raising his profile.  In December, the NUM affiliated to the new Congress of South African Trade Unions, and Barayi was elected as its president.

As COSATU president, Barayi strongly opposed the pass laws, and called for disinvestment in South Africa by foreign organisations.  He was arrested in 1986, and detained for two weeks without charge.  He stood down from his COSATU post in 1991, and retired fully in 1993.

References

1930 births
1994 deaths
South African trade union leaders
People from Cradock, Eastern Cape